Jamison may refer to:

People with the surname Jamison:
Jamison (surname)

In places:
 Jamison, California
 Jamison, Nebraska, US
 Jamison City, Pennsylvania, US
 Jamison, Pennsylvania, US
 Jamison Valley, New South Wales, Australia
Other:
 Jamison, a WWE personality portrayed by John DiGiacomo in the late 1980s/early 1990s
 Jamison family deaths, the disappearance and death of Bobby, Sherilynn, and Madyson Jamison

See also
 Jamison Centre, a shopping centre in the Australian Capital Territory 
 Little Jamison, California
 Jameson
 Jamieson (disambiguation)